Kayadere is a village in the Ömerli District of Mardin Province in Turkey. The village is populated by Kurds of the Surgucu tribe and had a population of 305 in 2021.

References 

Villages in Ömerli District
Kurdish settlements in Mardin Province